Väinö Ilkka Ilari Taipale (born 29 November 1942 in Helsinki) is a Finnish politician, physician and activist. A social democrat, he was a member of the Parliament of Finland for Helsinki from 1971 to 1975 and 2000 to 2007.

A doctor and surgeon by education, Taipale worked as a physician at several hospitals. He is also a docent of social medicine at University of Tampere.

Taipale has been active in many pacifist organisations and other governmental and non-governmental organisations. In 1966 he launched a political magazine, Ydin.

He is married, with four children, to fellow physician and politician, Vappu Taipale.

References

20th-century Finnish physicians
20th-century Finnish politicians
21st-century Finnish politicians
1942 births
Living people
Politicians from Helsinki
Social Democratic Party of Finland politicians
Members of the Parliament of Finland (1970–72)
Members of the Parliament of Finland (1972–75)
Members of the Parliament of Finland (1999–2003)
Members of the Parliament of Finland (2003–07)
Finnish pacifists
Physicians from Helsinki
Finnish magazine founders
Academic staff of the University of Tampere